Kalateh-ye Hamid (also Romanized as Kalāteh-ye Ḩamīd; also known as Kalāteh-ye Khān (Persian: كلاته خان) and Kalāteh Khān) is a village in Jannatabad Rural District, Salehabad County, Razavi Khorasan Province, Iran. At the 2006 census, its population was 224, in 40 families.

References 

Populated places in   Torbat-e Jam County